Rue Crémieux is a one-block pedestrian street in the 12th arrondissement of Paris, originally built as workers' housing. The street has been widely recommended to tourists for its quaint painted housefronts, and has become a popular destination for filming and for social media photos.

History
The street was planned as the Millaud development in 1857, to provide housing for workers, and almost all the buildings were constructed at that time. It was known as Rue Millaud from 1865 to 1898, when it was renamed for Adolphe Crémieux. A commemorative plaque marks the location. The street was closed to vehicles in 1993.

Appearance and popularity
One houses an unmarked hostel, the Hôtel particulier. Most of the house-fronts are painted in pastel colours, described by one writer as "candy-hued", and some also have trompe-l'œil decoration, including lilac trained around an entrance and a cat stalking birds. It has been compared to Portobello Road in London and the Venetian island of Burano and widely recommended for tourist photos and used for fashion shoots.

The street's popularity for selfies, Instagram posts, and video shoots has come to annoy the residents, who have started an Instagram account of their own to depict those taking and posing for photos and asked the city council for a gate to close off Rue Crémieux on weekends, in the evening, and at the golden hour.

References

External links
 
 Clubcremieux on Instagram

Streets in the 12th arrondissement of Paris
Tourist attractions in Paris